

Results

Green denotes finalists

References

Men's 1 metre springboard